Gerald Garcia (born  1949 in Hong Kong) is a British classical guitarist and composer.

After studying chemistry at Oxford University, he became a professional musician, making his debut at the Wigmore Hall in London. His more than fifteen CDs have sold more than 30,000 copies worldwide. In addition, he has performed with other musicians including John Williams, Paco Peña and John Renbourn.

Garcia is also known as a composer, particularly for his Etudes Esquisses for guitar, recorded for Naxos Records by John Holmquist.  He is musical director of the National Youth Guitar Ensemble.

Gerald Garcia lives in Oxford, where, according to his website, he enjoys "cooking, computer music, Taoist Yoga and conducting the odd chamber orchestra."

References

1949 births
British classical guitarists
British male guitarists
British composers
Living people